Never Turn Your Back on a Friend is the third studio album by Welsh heavy metal band Budgie, released in June 1973. This was drummer Ray Phillips' final appearance on a Budgie recording date. The album shows the band continuing the successful heavy metal formula of their previous album Squawk, adding a hint of speed metal in the single "Breadfan", one of the band's best known songs.

Roger Dean created the artwork for the album.

Track listing

Personnel
Budgie
Burke Shelley - bass, lead vocals
Tony Bourge - guitar, backing vocals
Ray Phillips - drums

References

Budgie (band) albums
Albums with cover art by Roger Dean (artist)
1973 albums
MCA Records albums
Albums recorded at Rockfield Studios